Sumbawanga Urban District is one of the four districts in the Rukwa Region of Tanzania.  It is bordered to the north by Lake Rukwa, to the east by the Mbeya Region, to the south by the Sumbawanga Rural District and to the west by the Nkasi District.  The district (and regional) capital is Sumbawanga.

According to the 2012 Tanzania National Census, the population of the Sumbawanga Urban District was 209,793.

Wards
The Sumbawanga Urban District is administratively divided into fifteen wards:

Chanji
Izia
Kasense
Katandala
Kizwite/Chanji
Majengo
Malangali
Matanga
Mazwi
Milanzi
Mollo
Ntendo
Old Sumbawanga
Pito
Senga

References

Districts of Rukwa Region